The 18th Avenue station is a local station on the BMT Sea Beach Line of the New York City Subway, located at the intersection of 18th Avenue and 64th Street in Bensonhurst, Brooklyn. It is served by the N train at all times. During rush hours, several W and northbound Q trains also serve the station.

Station layout

This open-cut station opened on June 22, 1915. It has four tracks and two side platforms, but the two center express tracks are not normally used. The Coney Island-bound express track has been disconnected from the line and the Manhattan-bound express track is signaled for trains in both directions. Both platforms are made of concrete and have beige (previously blue-green) rectangular columns running along them at regular intervals, alternating ones having the standard black name plate with white lettering. The platform walls are also beige.

This station was renovated between 2016 and 2019. From January 18, 2016 to May 22, 2017, the Manhattan-bound platform at this station was closed for renovations. The Coney Island-bound platform was closed for a much longer period of time, from July 31, 2017 to July 1, 2019.

The 2019 artwork here is called Fluxus/Rythmus by Emilio Perez. It features 22 glass mosaic panels, with forms inspired by movement and the energy of the neighborhood of the station.

Exits

This station has two fare control areas, one at each end of the platforms. The full-time side is at the east (railroad south) end. A single staircase from each platform goes up to a metal crossover, where a short staircase goes up to a set of doors that lead to the station house's waiting area. A turnstile bank provides access to and from the station. Outside fare control, there is a token booth and doors leading to the west side of 18th Avenue between 63rd and 64th Streets. The station house is shared with several businesses.

On the west (railroad north) end of the station, one staircase from each platform goes up to a metal crossover, where a set of doors lead to an un-staffed station house with one exit only turnstile and one High Entry/Exit Turnstile providing access to and from the station. The doors lead to the west side of 17th Avenue between 63rd and 64th Streets.

Notes

References

External links 

 
 Station Reporter — N Train
 The Subway Nut — 18th Avenue Pictures 
 18th Avenue entrance from Google Maps Street View
 17th Avenue entrance from Google Maps Street View

BMT Sea Beach Line stations
New York City Subway stations in Brooklyn
Railway stations in the United States opened in 1915
Bensonhurst, Brooklyn
1915 establishments in New York City